Billy Taylor with Four Flutes is an album by American jazz pianist Billy Taylor featuring tracks recorded in 1959 for the Riverside label.

Reception
Allmusic awarded the album 4 stars with reviewer Scott Yanow calling it "essentially bop, but the unusual instrumentation gives the set its own personality. Enjoyable music that certainly stands out from the crowd".

Track listing
All compositions by Billy Taylor except as indicated
 "The Song Is Ended" (Irving Berlin) - 3:54   
 "Back Home" - 6:44   
 "St. Thomas" (Sonny Rollins) - 2:28   
 "Oh, Lady Be Good" (George Gershwin, Ira Gershwin) - 4:40   
 "No Parking" - 2:53   
 "Koolbongo" (Mary Lou Williams) - 4:18   
 "Blue Shutters" - 6:54   
 "One for the Woofer" - 4:42   
 "How About You?" (Ralph Freed, Burton Lane) - 4:54  
 Recorded in New York City on July 20 (tracks 1, 2 & 7-9) and July 24 (tracks 3-6), 1959.

Personnel 
Billy Taylor - piano
Phil Bodner (tracks 1, 2 & 7-9), Herbie Mann (tracks 1-4 & 6-9), Seldon Powell (track 5), Jerome Richardson (tracks 1-6 & 8), Jerry Sanfino (tracks 3-6), Bill Slapin (tracks 3-7 & 9), Frank Wess (tracks 1, 2 & 7-9) - flute 
Tommy Williams - bass
Dave Bailey (tracks 1, 2 & 7-9), Albert Heath (tracks 3-6) - drums
Chino Pozo - congas

References 

1959 albums
Albums produced by Orrin Keepnews
Riverside Records albums
Billy Taylor albums